The Cannon was an automobile manufactured in Kalamazoo, Michigan, by the Burtt Manufacturing Company from 1902 to 1906.  They made several different tonneau models, with both two- and four-cylinder engines, up to 6.5L displacement.

See also
Brass Era car

References
 

Defunct motor vehicle manufacturers of the United States
Motor vehicle manufacturers based in Michigan
Defunct manufacturing companies based in Michigan